Dub Syndicate is a dub band, formed by Adrian Sherwood, which became a showcase for Adrian Sherwood's collaboration  with Lincoln "Style" Scott, former drummer with the Roots Radics, Suns of Arqa and Creation Rebel.

Dub Syndicate initially evolved out of Creation Rebel and had a classic dub sound until the third album, Tunes From The Missing Channel (1985), where Dub Syndicate gave  birth to a more experimental, technological dub sound. Dub Syndicate's new sound centered on the interaction of Scott, Sherwood, and members of Tackhead, Skip McDonald, Keith LeBlanc and Doug Wimbish.

Dub Syndicate has collaborated with many other artists including Lee "Scratch" Perry, Bim Sherman (vocals), Felix "Deadley Headley" Bennett (saxophone) and Peter "Dr. Pablo" Stroud (melodica), (N.B. Dr. Pablo is not Augustus Pablo).

Most of the band's output has appeared on On-U Sound Records, produced by the label's owner Adrian Sherwood. More recent Dub Syndicate recordings were released on Style Scott's own Lion & Roots record label, and production duties were split between Sherwood, Scientist and Scott. More recently Dub Syndicate has worked with Dancehall artists such as Luciano, Capleton and Jr. Reid.

Scott was found dead in Jamaica on 11 October 2014.

Discography

Albums 
 The Pounding System (Ambience in Dub) (1982)
 One Way System (1983)
 North of the River Thames (with Dr. Pablo, 1984)
 Tunes from the Missing Channel (1985)
 Time Boom X De Devil Dead (with Lee "Scratch" Perry, 1987)
 Strike the Balance (1990)
 From the Secret Laboratory (with Lee "Scratch" Perry, 1990)
 Stoned Immaculate (1991)
 Echomania (1994)
 Ital Breakfast (1996)
 Mellow & Colly (1998)
 Fear of a Green Planet (1998)
 Acres of Space (2001)
 No Bed of Roses (2004)
 Hard Food (2015)

Pounding System 
 Pounding System
 Hi-Fi Gets a Pounding, Pts. 1 & 2
 "African Head Charge"-Don't Care About Space Invader Machines, Pt. 1&2
 Fringe on Top Dub
 Humorless Journalist Works to Rules
 # 10 K at Ovu -60 Hz- Mind Boggles
 Crucial Tony Tries to Rescue the Space Invaders
 Hi-Fi Gets a Pounding, Pt. 3
 Return to Stage One

One Way System 
 Socca
 Overloader
 Drilling Equipment
 Drainpipe Rats
 Schemers
 Ascendant, Pt. 4
 Synchronizer
 Independence
 Substyle
 Displaced Master
 Ascendant, Pt. 6

North of the River Thames 
 Man of Mystery
 Dr. Who?
 Pressurized
 Tribute
 A Taste of Honey
 North of the River Thames
 Red Sea
 We Like It Hot

Tunes from the Missing Channel 
 Ravi Shankar, Pt. 1  3:41
 The Show Is Coming  4:50
 Must Be Dreaming  4:26
 Overboard  3:41
 Forever More  4:16
 Geoffrey Boycott  4:33
 Wellie  2:57
 Jolly  4:11
 Out and About  5:48

Compilations 
 Classic Selection Volume 1 (1989)
 Classic Selection Volume 2 (1990)
 Live at the T+C - 1991 – with Akabu and Bim Sherman (1993)
 Classic Selection Volume 3 (1994)
 Research and Development (1996)
 Live at the Maritime Hall (2000)
 Murder Tone (2002)
 Pure Thrill Seekers (2005)
 The Rasta Far I (2006)
 The Royal Variety Show (The Best of Dub Syndicate)
 On U Sound 30 years anniversary (King Size Dub Special)

References

External links
Official site
Artist page at unofficial On-U Sound site
Discography at unofficial On-U Sound site
Early Dub Syndicate Drummer Interview
The definitive Adrian Sherwood interview
Discography at Discogs

ROIR artists
British reggae musical groups
Dub musical groups
On-U Sound Records artists